Her New York is a 1917 American silent drama film directed by O. A. C. Lund and Eugene Moore and starring Gladys Hulette, William Parke Jr. and Riley Chamberlin.

Cast
 Gladys Hulette as Phoebe Lester 
 William Parke Jr. as Philip Dawes 
 Riley Chamberlin as Farmer Si Brown 
 Carey L. Hastings as Brown's Wife 
 Robert Vaughn as Stuyvesant Owen 
 Ethyle Cooke as Laura 
 Gerald Badgley as Young Child

References

Bibliography
 Robert B. Connelly. The Silents: Silent Feature Films, 1910-36, Volume 40, Issue 2. December Press, 1998.

External links
 

1917 films
1917 drama films
1910s English-language films
American silent feature films
Silent American drama films
American black-and-white films
Films directed by Eugene Moore
Pathé Exchange films
1910s American films